Yamunotri Temple is situated in the western region of Garhwal Himalayas at an altitude of  in Uttarkashi district, Uttarakhand. It's just 129 km from Uttarkashi, the main district headquarters. The temple is dedicated to Goddess Yamuna, and has a black marble idol of the goddess. The Yamunotri temple is a full day's journey from Uttarakhand's main towns — Uttarkashi, Rishikesh, Haridwar or Dehradun. The actual temple is only accessible by a  trek from the town of Hanuman Chatti and a  walk from Janki Chatti; horses or palanquins are available for rent. The hike from Hanuman Chatti to Yamunotri takes in views of a number of waterfalls. There are two trekking routes from Hanuman Chatti to Yamunotri; the one along the right bank proceeds via the Markandeya Tirth, where the sage Markandeya wrote the Markandeya Purana.  The other route–which lies on the left bank of the river–goes via Kharsali, from where Yamunotri is a five or six hours climb.

History
Yamunotri temple has a shrine dedicated to the goddess. There is also an 18th-century temple at Gangotri, it was built by garhwal naresh Pratap Shah, it was damaged and re-innovated in the 19th century. The temple has been destroyed twice by snow and floods before being rebuilt. It is located on the backdrop of Bandarpunch. The temple is part of the revered Char Dham pilgrimage circuit.

Temple and vicinity
The temple opens on Akshaya Tritiya (May) and closes on Yama Dwitiya (the second day after Diwali, November) for the winter. A little ahead is the actual source of the river Yamuna, which is at an altitude of about  approximately. Surya Kund has boiling hot water, while Gauri Kund has tepid water suitable for bathing  The spring water is said to be hot enough to cook rice and potatoes. Lodging at the temple itself is limited to a few small ashrams and guest-houses. Ritual duties, such as the making and distribution of prasad (sanctified offerings) and the supervision of pujas (ritual venerations), are performed by the Uniyal family of pujaris (priests). Unique aspects of ritual practice at the site include hot springs, where raw rice is cooked and made into prasad.

References
11. Yamunotri Temple History In Hindi

Hindu pilgrimage sites in India
Hindu holy cities
Hindu temples in Uttarakhand
Chota Char Dham temples